The Youth Performing Arts School (YPAS) is a performing arts school in Louisville, Kentucky, United States, that concentrates on various vocal, instrumental, theatre, musical theatre and dance disciplines for high school students. Students who attend have no less than a ninety-minute block of arts studies each day (sometimes more), with the balance of their academic classes at duPont Manual High School. YPAS is one of only 100 U.S. schools of its type. Students are selected from within Jefferson County through a vigorous audition process. Annually, about 85% of student graduates attend major performing arts colleges.

YPAS offers the following majors: Design and Production, Vocal, Orchestra, Band, Piano, Guitar, Theater, Musical Theatre, and Dance.

Notable alumni

 Chad Broskey (2005), actor
 Sean Cunningham, musician, singer
 Paige Davis (1987), theater performer, host of Trading Spaces on TLC from 2001 to 2005
 Sara Gettelfinger (1995), Broadway performer and film actress (Sex and the City)
 R. Prophet, rapper
 Kira Reed (1989), actress and television producer
 Nicole Scherzinger (1996), past member and lead singer of The Pussycat Dolls

See also
 Public schools in Louisville, Kentucky

References

External links
YPAS school site
YPAS Alumni website
YPAS Alumni on Facebook

Jefferson County Public Schools (Kentucky)
Public high schools in Kentucky
Magnet schools in Kentucky
Schools of the performing arts in the United States
Performing arts in Kentucky